Ilyinskoye is a rural locality (a selo) in Volosatovskoye Rural Settlement, Selivanovsky District, Vladimir Oblast, Russia. The population was 44 as of 2010.

Geography 
Ilyinskoye is located on the Kestromka River, 22 km north of Krasnaya Gorbatka (the district's administrative centre) by road. Pribrezhnaya is the nearest rural locality.

References 

Rural localities in Selivanovsky District